The Assembly Affairs Museum, The Legislative Yuan is a museum in Wufeng District, Taichung, Taiwan.

History
The museum was established by Legislative Yuan Secretary-General Lin Hsi-shan to maintain and make public the historical data of the legislature and continued the archival work of Legislative Yuan.

Exhibitions

Section 1
 The collection, collation, analysis, research, archival and digitization of the documents and artifacts-related to the history of assembly development
 The collection and collation of the documents and artifacts-related to the history of local assembly development
 The collection and collation of local assembly publications
 Worldwide inter-museum cooperation and exchange

Section 2
 The utilization and exhibition of the documents and artifacts-related to the history of assembly development
 The utilization and exhibition of the documents and artifacts-related to the history of local assembly development
 The utilization and exhibition of local assembly publications
 The exhibition of the files, historical documents and books and data that are historic in assembly development
 Exhibitions, contacts, services and guided tours of assembly data

Responsibilities
 Matters relating to the collection, organization, archiving and exhibition of assembly affairs-related historical materials
 Matters relating to the analysis, study and use of assembly affairs-related historical materials
 Matters relating to the digitization of assembly affairs-related historical materials and associated services
 Liaising on other assembly affairs information-related services

See also
 List of museums in Taiwan
 Legislative Yuan

References

External links

  

2007 establishments in Taiwan
History museums in Taiwan
Museums established in 2007
Museums in Taichung